Kunal Nayyar (born 30 April 1981) is a British actor. He portrayed Raj Koothrappali on the CBS sitcom The Big Bang Theory (2007–2019) and voiced Vijay on the Nickelodeon animated sitcom Sanjay and Craig (2013–2016). Nayyar also appeared in the films Ice Age: Continental Drift (2012), The Scribbler (2014), Dr. Cabbie (2014), Consumed (2015), Trolls (2016) and Sweetness in the Belly (2019). Forbes listed Nayyar as the world's third-highest-paid television actor in 2015 and 2018, with earnings of US$20 million and US$23.5 million, respectively.

Early life
Nayyar was born on 30 April 1981 in Hammersmith, London, to a family of Indian immigrants. When he was three years old, his family returned to India and he grew up in New Delhi, where his parents live. He attended St. Columba's School, where he played badminton for the school team.

In 1999, Nayyar moved to the United States to pursue a Bachelor of Business Administration in finance from the University of Portland in Oregon. He started taking acting classes and appeared in several school plays while working on his degree.

After participating in the American College Theater Festival, Nayyar decided to become an actor. He then attended Temple University in Philadelphia, Pennsylvania, where he received a Master of Fine Arts in acting.

Career

After graduating, Nayyar found work doing American television ads and plays on the London stage. He first gained attention in the US for his role in the West Coast production of Rajiv Joseph's 2006 play Huck & Holden, where he portrayed an Indian exchange student anxious to experience American culture before returning home. In 2006, Nayyar teamed up with Arun Das to write the play Cotton Candy, which premiered in New Delhi to positive reviews.

Nayyar made a guest appearance on the CBS drama NCIS in the season four episode "Suspicion", in which he played Youssef Zidan, an Iraqi terrorist.

In 2007, Nayyar's agent heard about a role for a scientist in an upcoming CBS pilot and encouraged him to audition for the part. This led to his casting in the sitcom The Big Bang Theory, where he played the role of an astrophysicist Raj Koothrappali from its premiere in September of that year to the show's conclusion in May 2019.

In 2011, he co-hosted the Tribute to Nerds show with co-star Simon Helberg at the comedy festival Just for Laughs.

Nayyar voiced Gupta in Ice Age: Continental Drift in 2012. During the same year he completed the shooting of the film, Dr. Cabbie, produced by Bollywood actor Salman Khan.

From 5 May to 29 June 2015, Nayyar performed in an off-Broadway production, The Spoils, written by and starring actor Jesse Eisenberg. Nayyar played Kalyan, a Nepalese student and roommate of the protagonist Ben, played by Eisenberg. The production transferred to London's West End in 2016.

Nayyar published a book about his career journey, titled Yes, My Accent is Real: and Some Other Things I Haven’t Told You, in September 2015.

He voiced another animated movie character named Guy Diamond in DreamWorks' Trolls, released in November 2016.

In 2020, Nayyar played a convicted serial killer named Sandeep on the Netflix UK production Criminal: UK. He appeared in the final episode of Season 2, which was released in August 2020. In the same year, he joined the cast of the thriller TV series Suspicion on Apple TV+, based on the Israeli thriller TV series False Flag, alongside Uma Thurman, Elizabeth Henstridge and Elyes Gabel.

In 2021, he was announced as having been picked to play the title role of A. J. Fikry in the upcoming comedy drama The Storied Life Of A. J. Fikry, alongside Lucy Hale and Christina Hendricks, an adaptation of the best-selling novel by Gabrielle Zevin.

Personal life
In December 2011, Nayyar married Neha Kapur, a model, actress, and Femina Miss India 2006.

Filmography

Film

Television

Theatre

Awards

References

External links

 

1981 births
Living people
21st-century British male actors
21st-century Indian male actors
British expatriate male actors in the United States
British expatriates in India
British male actors of Indian descent
British male film actors
British male television actors
British male voice actors
British people of Indian descent
British people of Punjabi descent
Indian male film actors
Indian male television actors
Indian male voice actors
Male actors from London
Male actors from New Delhi
People from Hounslow
People from New Delhi
St. Columba's School, Delhi alumni
Temple University alumni
University of Portland alumni